The 1983 New York Mets season was the 22nd regular season for the Mets. They went 68–94 and finished in sixth place in the National League East. They were managed by George Bamberger and Frank Howard. They played home games at Shea Stadium.

Offseason 
 December 10, 1982: Mike Scott was traded by the Mets to the Houston Astros for Danny Heep.
 December 16, 1982: Charlie Puleo, Lloyd McClendon, and Jason Felice (minors) were traded by the Mets to the Cincinnati Reds for Tom Seaver.
 January 13, 1983: The Mets traded a player to be named later to the Boston Red Sox for Mike Torrez. The Mets completed the deal by sending Mike Davis (minors) to the Red Sox on February 15.

Regular season 
 May 6, 1983: Darryl Strawberry made his major league debut.

Season standings

Record vs. opponents

Opening Day starters 
Bob Bailor
Hubie Brooks
George Foster
Brian Giles
Ron Hodges
Mike Howard
Dave Kingman
Tom Seaver
Mookie Wilson

Notable transactions 
 April 7, 1983: Clint Hurdle was signed as a free agent by the Mets.
 June 6, 1983: 1983 Major League Baseball Draft
Stan Jefferson was drafted by the Mets in the 1st round (20th pick).
Matt Williams was drafted by the Mets in the 27th round, but did not sign.
 June 15, 1983: Neil Allen and Rick Ownbey were traded by the Mets to the St. Louis Cardinals for Keith Hernandez.
 July 22, 1983: Scott Dye (minors) was traded by the Mets to the Oakland Athletics for Kelvin Moore.

Roster

Player stats

Batting

Starters by position 
Note: Pos = Position; G = Games played; AB = At bats; H = Hits; Avg. = Batting average; HR = Home runs; RBI = Runs batted in

Other batters 
Note: G = Games played; AB = At bats; H = Hits; Avg. = Batting average; HR = Home runs; RBI = Runs batted in

Pitching

Starting pitchers 
Note: G = Games pitched; IP = Innings pitched; W = Wins; L = Losses; ERA = Earned run average; SO = Strikeouts

Other pitchers 
Note: G = Games pitched; IP = Innings pitched; W = Wins; L = Losses; ERA = Earned run average; SO = Strikeouts

Relief pitchers 
Note: G = Games pitched; W = Wins; L = Losses; SV = Saves; ERA = Earned run average; SO = Strikeouts

Awards and honors 
 Darryl Strawberry, Rookie of the Year
 Keith Hernandez, Gold Glove
All-Star Game
 Jesse Orosco, Pitcher

Farm system 

LEAGUE CHAMPIONS: Tidewater, Lynchburg

Notes

References 
1983 New York Mets at Baseball Reference
1983 New York Mets team page at www.baseball-almanac.com

New York Mets seasons
New York Mets
New York Mets
1980s in Queens